Tobi "Bob" Jnohope (born 4 October 4, 1997) is a Dominican association footballer who currently plays for Lernayin Artsakh FC of the Armenian Premier League.

Youth and college
Jnohope began his youth career with Clearwater Chargers Soccer Club in Florida where he played for 10 years before joining the Sounders FC Academy in 2015.  On 3 February 2016, it was announced that Jnohope signed a letter of intent to play college soccer at the University of Denver. After being redshirted as a freshman, he was expected by some media outlets to play a greater role for the upcoming year. However, he was off the roster by the start of the 2017 season.

Club career
On 25 March 2016, Jnohope made his professional debut for Seattle Sounders FC 2 of the USL, the reserve side of Seattle Sounders FC of Major League Soccer. The match ended in a 1–0 defeat to Sacramento Republic. In total he made five league appearances for the club during the 2016 USL season.

In January 2019, Jnohope signed for Mosta of the Maltese Premier League. After waiting for four months for his work permit, he appeared in three league matches and one match in the Maltese FA Trophy for the club before the season ended and his 6-month contract expired. His one 2018–19 Maltese FA Trophy appearance came in a 1–2 quarter-final defeat to Birkirkara in which Jnohope scored an own goal. Afterward he had a training stint with Belgian club RAQM Mons while searching for a new club.

In October 2020 Jnohope was unveiled as a new signing for U.S. Palmese 1912 of the Italian Eccellenza Calabria for the 2020–21 season. In March 2021 he moved to Lernayin Artsakh FC of the Armenian First League. He made his league debut for the club on 15 March against FC Urartu-2, starting the match and playing the full ninety minutes of the 1–0 victory.

International career
Jnohope was born in Florida, United States to a Dominican Kalinago father and Nigerian Yoruba mother. After initially being undecided about which nation to represent, in July 2019 he was included in Dominica's under-23 squad for 2020 CONCACAF Men's Olympic Qualifying Championship qualification. He scored his team's only goal in its opening match against Jamaica, an eventual surprise 1–1 draw. He went on to make two appearances in the tournament.

References

External links
Denver Pioneers bio
Malta Football Association profile

1997 births
Living people
American soccer players
Association football defenders
Soccer players from Florida
Denver Pioneers men's soccer players
Mosta F.C. players
USL Championship players
Maltese Premier League players
Sportspeople from Clearwater, Florida
People from Largo, Florida
Expatriate footballers in Malta
Expatriate footballers in Italy
Expatriate footballers in Armenia
American expatriate soccer players
African-American soccer players
American people of Dominica descent
American sportspeople of Nigerian descent
Dominica footballers
Dominica international footballers
Dominica under-20 international footballers
Dominica youth international footballers
Dominica expatriate footballers
21st-century African-American sportspeople